An indirect presidential election (officially the 7th Federal Convention) was held in West Germany on 23 May 1979. Deeming his reelection to be unlikely, incumbent Walter Scheel elected not to seek a second term. The two candidates to replace him were the President of the Bundestag Karl Carstens, nominated by the Christian Democratic Union and Carstens' immediate predecessor Annemarie Renger, nominated by the Social Democratic Party. Carstens won the election on the first ballot.

Composition of the Federal Convention
The President is elected by the Federal Convention consisting of all the members of the Bundestag and an equal number of delegates representing the states. These are divided proportionally by population to each state, and each state's delegation is divided among the political parties represented in its parliament so as to reflect the partisan proportions in the parliament.

Source: Eine Dokumentation aus Anlass der Wahl des Bundespräsidenten am 18. März 2012

Results

References

1979 in West Germany
1979
May 1979 events in Europe
1979 elections in Germany